Travis may refer to:

People and fictional characters
Travis (given name), a list of people and fictional characters
Travis (surname), a list of people

Places in the United States
Travis, Staten Island, a neighborhood
Travis Air Force Base, a United States Air Force base in California
Travis, Texas, an unincorporated community
Travis County, Texas
Lake Travis, Texas, a reservoir on the Colorado River

Schools
William B. Travis High School (Austin, Texas)
William B. Travis High School (Fort Bend County, Texas)
Travis Elementary School (disambiguation), schools in Texas and California

Other uses
Travis (band), a Scottish band
Travis (chimpanzee) (died 2009), a domesticated chimpanzee who attacked and mauled a Connecticut woman
Travis CI, a hosted continuous integration service, for software development

See also
Trevis (disambiguation)